Ghoria dirhabdus is a moth of the family Erebidae. It was described by Walter Rothschild in 1916. It is found on Sumatra and the Dampier Archipelago off the north-western coast of Australia.

References

Lithosiina
Moths described in 1916
Moths of Indonesia